Piper High School may refer to:

Piper High School (Florida) — Sunrise, Florida
Piper High School (Kansas) — Kansas City, Kansas